The 2011 German Figure Skating Championships took place on January 7–9, 2011 at the Eissportzentrum Oberstdorf in Oberstdorf. Skaters competed in the disciplines of men's singles, ladies' singles, pair skating, and ice dancing on the senior, junior, and novice levels. The results were among the criteria used to choose the German teams to the 2011 World Championships and 2011 European Championships.

Medalists

Senior

Junior

Novice

Senior results

Men

 WD = Withdrew

Ladies

Pairs

Ice dancing

External links
 2011 German Championships: Senior results
 2011 German Championships: Junior, youth, and novice results
 German Nationals

German Championships
German Figure Skating Championships
Figure Skating Championships